In mathematics, Milliken's tree theorem in combinatorics is a partition theorem generalizing Ramsey's theorem to infinite trees, objects with more structure than sets.

Let T be a finitely splitting rooted tree of height ω, n a positive integer, and  the collection of all strongly embedded subtrees of T of height n. In one of its simple forms, Milliken's tree theorem states that if  then for some strongly embedded infinite subtree R of T,  for some i ≤ r.

This immediately implies Ramsey's theorem; take the tree T to be a linear ordering on ω vertices. 

Define  where T ranges over finitely splitting rooted trees of height ω. Milliken's tree theorem says that not only is  partition regular for each n < ω, but that the homogeneous subtree R guaranteed by the theorem is strongly embedded in T.

Strong embedding 
Call T an α-tree if each branch of T has cardinality α. S is strongly embedded in T if:

 , and the partial order on S is induced from T,

Intuitively, for S to be strongly embedded in T, 
 S must be a subset of T with the induced partial order
 S must preserve the branching structure of T; i.e., if a nonmaximal node in S has n immediate successors in T, then it has n immediate successors in S
 S preserves the level structure of T; all nodes on a common level of S must be on a common level in T.

References

Keith R. Milliken, A Ramsey Theorem for Trees J. Comb. Theory (Series A)  26 (1979), 215-237
Keith R. Milliken, A Partition Theorem for the Infinite Subtrees of a Tree, Trans. Amer. Math. Soc. 263 No.1 (1981), 137-148.

Ramsey theory
Theorems in discrete mathematics
Trees (set theory)